West School can refer to:

West School (Burlington, Massachusetts), listed on the National Register of Historic Places (NRHP) in Middlesex County
West School (Crooksville, Ohio), NRHP-listed in Perry County
West School (Stoughton, Wisconsin), NRHP-listed in Dane County

See also
West Schoolhouse (disambiguation)